Piper City is a village in Ford County, Illinois, United States. The population was 826 at the 2010 census.

Geography
Piper City is located at  (40.756749, -88.189560).

History

Piper City was laid out in 1867 by Samuel Cross of New York and William A. Piper (5 March 1820 – 6 July 1896) of Philadelphia. The original plat was named Brenton. It was a station on the Toledo Peoria and Western Railroad, which had been completed ten years earlier. The present name of the town, which was adapted soon after the town was founded, comes from Piper who had extensive land holdings in the area. Cross lived briefly in the township, but little is known of his life. An earlier railroad siding and grain station known as Brenton had been established two miles to the east of the eventual location of the town. The new station was therefore briefly known as New Brenton. The Original Town lay on both sides of the railroad and the streets were aligned with the railroad, which was angled slightly away from true north–south.  John Allen and W. C. Jones opened the first store in Piper City the summer of 1867. A second store called Piper, Montelius and Company was operated by J.A. Montelius, Piper's nephew, but it is unclear if Piper was actually a resident in the new town. The first Post Office was in the home of John R. Lewis, who had been a land agent for the Illinois Central Railroad. A Presbyterian Church was established in 1869, a Catholic church in 1880 and a Methodist church in 1881.  In 1870, Montelius established a bank and was, for many years, the leading citizen of Piper City. In 1887, B.W. Kensey began the Piper City Journal. In 1924, when the people of Piper City learned that a new highway, soon to be known as U.S. 24, would pass a quarter mile south of the town, a delegation was sent to the governor to protest. They were unsuccessful.  The town has been an important grain shipping point for the rich agricultural land of the pan handle of Ford County.

Demographics

As of the census of 2000, there were 781 people, 307 households, and 210 families residing in the village. The racial makeup of the village was 96.67% White, 0.13% African American, 0.38% Native American, 0.90% Asian, 0.51% from other races, and 1.41% from two or more races. Hispanic or Latino of any race were 1.54% of the population.

There were 307 households, out of which 29.6% had children under the age of 18 living with them, 58.0% were married couples living together, 8.1% had a female householder with no husband present, and 31.3% were non-families. 29.3% of all households were made up of individuals, and 20.5% had someone living alone who was 65 years of age or older.  The average household size was 2.45 and the average family size was 3.01.

In the village, the population was spread out, with 25.4% under the age of 18, 6.5% from 18 to 24, 23.0% from 25 to 44, 22.8% from 45 to 64, and 22.3% who were 65 years of age or older.  The median age was 42 years. For every 100 females, there were 86.0 males.  For every 100 females age 18 and over, there were 78.3 males.

The median income for a household in the village was $36,250, and the median income for a family was $40,278. Males had a median income of $33,393 versus $21,750 for females. The per capita income for the village was $19,393.  About 7.1% of families and 10.0% of the population were below the poverty line, including 10.6% of those under age 18 and 7.8% of those age 65 or over.

Notable people

 Elmer Koestner, pitcher for the Cleveland Naps, Chicago Cubs and Cincinnati Reds; born in Piper City

References

Villages in Ford County, Illinois
Villages in Illinois
Populated places established in 1867